Giordano di San Stefano Ansalone, OP (1598 – 17 November 1634) was an Italian Dominican missionary in Asia. He is a Catholic martyr, beatified in 1981 and canonized in 1987 by Pope John Paul II.

Life
Ansalone was born at Santo Stefano Quisquina in Sicily.  Having entered the Dominican Order and completed his studies at Salamanca, he was sent in 1625, together with many others, as a missionary to the Philippine Islands. Whilst serving as chaplain in a hospital for Chinese and Japanese at Manila he learned their languages.

In 1631, he offered to go to Japan and arrived at the outbreak of the persecution in 1632. Disguised as a bonze, he travelled over the land and administered the rites of the Catholic religion.

He was arrested 4 August 1634, and subjected to tortures that lasted seven days. He was forced to witness the beheading of his companion, Thomas of St. Hyacinth, and sixty-nine other Christians. On 18 November he was executed at Nagasaki, Japan, by being suspended till dead from a plank with his head buried in the ground.

Works

Whilst detained in Mexico, on his way to the Philippine Islands, he wrote in Latin a series of lives of Dominican saints after a similar work by Hernando del Castillo. He left at Manila an unfinished treatise on Chinese religion.

References

Attribution
  The entry cites:
Quétif and Echard, SS. Ord. Præd., II, 478: 
Alvarez del Manzano, Compendio de la reseña biográfica de los religiosos de la Provincia de Santisimo Rosario de Filipinas (Manila, 1896), 122 sqq.

1598 births
1634 deaths
People from Santo Stefano Quisquina
Italian Dominicans
Italian Roman Catholic missionaries
Italian Roman Catholic saints
Japanese Roman Catholic saints
17th-century venerated Christians
Beatifications by Pope John Paul II
Roman Catholic missionaries in Japan
Italian expatriates in Japan
Dominican missionaries
17th-century executions by Japan
Italian people executed abroad
Roman Catholic missionaries in the Philippines
Italian expatriates in the Philippines
Religious leaders from the Province of Agrigento